Serralunga d'Alba is a comune (municipality) in the Province of Cuneo in the Italian region Piedmont, located about  southeast of Turin and about  northeast of Cuneo.

Serralunga d'Alba borders the following municipalities: Alba, Castiglione Falletto, Diano d'Alba, Monforte d'Alba, Montelupo Albese, Roddino, and Sinio.

References

Cities and towns in Piedmont
Castles in Italy